Many ethnic Chinese people have lived in Indonesia for many centuries. Over time, especially under social and political pressure during the New Order era, most Chinese Indonesians have adopted names that better match the local language.

History of Chinese Indonesian surnames

Colonial era until 1965
During the Dutch colonial era, the Dutch administration recorded Chinese names in birth certificates and other legal documents using an adopted spelling convention that was based primarily on the Hokkien (Southern Min), the language of the majority of Chinese immigrants in the Dutch East Indies. The administrators used the closest Dutch pronunciation and spelling of Hokkien words to record the names. A similar thing happened in Malaya, where the British administrators record the names using English spelling. (For instance, compare Lim (English) vs. Liem (Dutch), Wee or Ooi (English) vs. Oei or Oey (Dutch), Goh (English) vs. Go (Dutch), Chan (English) vs. Tjan (Dutch), Lee (English) vs. Lie (Dutch), Leong (English) vs Liong (Dutch).) Hence, Lin (林, Mandarin) is spelled Liem in Indonesia. Chen (陳) is Tan, Huang (黃) is Oei or Oey, Wu (吳) is Go, Wei (魏) is Goei or Ngoei, Guo (郭) is Kwee, Yang (楊) is Njoo, and so on.

Further, as Hokkien romanization standard did not exist then, some romanized names varied slightly. For example, 郭 (Guo) could sometimes be Kwik, Que or Kwek instead of Kwee and Huang is often Oei instead of Oey.

The spelling convention survived through the Japanese occupation (1942–1945) well into Indonesian independence (1945) and sovereignty acknowledgment by the Dutch government (1949). Since the independent Indonesian government inherited the Dutch legal system, it also survived until 1965 in the Sukarno era.

The Indonesian government later began changing Indonesian spelling to harmonize it with the spelling used for Malay in Malaysia, Singapore and Brunei, first under the Ejaan Suwandi introduced in 1947, and again under the Ejaan Yang Disempurnakan, literally "Perfected Spelling", adopted in 1972. Under the Suwandi system of spelling, "oe", influenced by Dutch, became "u", influenced by English; for example, Loe was spelled as Lu. Since 1972, Dutch-style "j" became "y", meaning Njoo is now spelled Nyoo.

1966–1998
After Suharto came to power, his regime created many anti-Chinese legislations in Indonesia. One of them was 127/U/Kep/12/1966 which strongly encouraged ethnic Chinese living in Indonesia to adopt Indonesian-sounding names instead of the standard three-word or two-word Chinese names.

Many Indonesianized names are Hokkien surname syllables with western or Indonesian prefix or suffix – resulting in many exotic-sounding names. Although two Chinese individuals shared the same Chinese surname, they may employ different strategies for the Indonesian-sounding names. For example, one with the surname 林 (Lin) may adopt "Limanto", and the other may adopt "Halim" as Indonesian-sounding names. "Limanto" and "Halim" both contain "lim" that corresponds to the 林 surname (Mandarin: Lin, Cantonese: Lam or Lum, Hokkien: Liem or Lim = forest). The famous 1966 political activist and businessman Sofjan Wanandi (Chinese romanization: Liem Bian Koen) translated Lin to old Javanese "wana", meaning forest, and added the male-suffix "ndi", resulting in the new clan name Wanandi.

Despite the Indonesianization, the Hokkien surnames are still used today by the Chinese-Indonesian diaspora overseas (mostly in the Netherlands, Germany, and USA); by those Chinese-Indonesians courageous enough during Suharto's regime to keep their Chinese names (e.g., Kwik Kian Gie), or by those who couldn't afford to process the name change through Indonesia's civil bureaucracy.

2000–present
After Suharto resigned from the presidency, subsequent governments revoked the ban on the ethnic Chinese from speaking and learning Chinese in public. Using the original Chinese surnames is no longer a taboo but only a small minority have decided to re-adopt the original Hokkien names of their grandparents or to use the Mandarin Chinese pinyin romanization, pronunciation and spelling, for example author Maria Audrey Lukito legally changed her name to Yu Jia Hui.

Examples of Chinese surnames and their Indonesian-sounding adoptions

See also

 Chinese Indonesians
 List of common Chinese surnames
 Legislation on Chinese Indonesians
 Sōshi-kaimei for Japanese policy on Korean names during Japan's occupation of Korea
Filipino-Chinese surname, for a similar phenomenon of surname localisation

References

Indonesian names

Chinese Indonesian culture

id:Nama Tionghoa